Spiny rat may refer to:
Echimyidae, the Neotropical spiny rats, a family of South and Central American caviomorph rodents
or any of the following genera or species of tropical or subtropical east Asian or Australasian rats of subfamily Murinae:
Echiothrix, a rat genus from Sulawesi
Maxomys, a genus of Southeast Asian rats
Large New Guinea spiny rat (Rattus praetor), a rat species from New Guinea and nearby islands
Small spiny rat or Stein's rat (Rattus steini), a rat species from New Guinea
Mindanao spiny rat (Tarsomys echinatus) from Mindanao
Tokudaia, a rat genus from the Ryukyu Islands

Animal common name disambiguation pages